Delmar E. DeLong (June 7, 1931 – June 30, 1999) was an American lawyer, Wisconsin State Representative and farmer.

Born in Beloit, Wisconsin, DeLong served in the United States Army from 1953 to 1955. He received his  bachelor's degree and law degrees from University of Wisconsin–Madison. He practiced law, was a farmer, and in the feed and grain business. He served as municipal court judge for the town of Turtle, Wisconsin, the Clinton, Wisconsin village board and Clinton Board of Education. He served in the Wisconsin State Assembly from 1973 to 1982 as a Republican. He also served on the Wisconsin Technical College Board. He died in Ocala, Florida.

Notes

1931 births
1999 deaths
Politicians from Beloit, Wisconsin
Military personnel from Wisconsin
University of Wisconsin–Madison alumni
University of Wisconsin Law School alumni
Businesspeople from Wisconsin
Farmers from Wisconsin
Wisconsin lawyers
Republican Party members of the Wisconsin State Assembly
Wisconsin city council members
School board members in Wisconsin
20th-century American lawyers
20th-century American businesspeople
20th-century American politicians
People from Clinton, Rock County, Wisconsin